An Arrow Through the Bitch is an EP by Palace Brothers, released in 1994 through Domino Records in the United Kingdom. The EP is a collection of two singles previously released in the US on Drag City: "Come In" / "Trudy Dies" (1993) and "Horses" / "Stable Will" (1994).

Track listing
"Come In" – 3:00
"Horses" (Brendan Croker, Sally Timms, Jon Langford) – 4:28
"Stable Will" (Bryan Rich) – 5:49
"Trudy Dies" – 5:08

References

1994 EPs
Will Oldham albums
Drag City (record label) EPs